Franklin Park may refer to some places in the United States:

 Franklin Park, Boston, a large public park in Boston, Massachusetts
 Franklin Park (Columbus park), a park in Columbus, Ohio
 Franklin Park (Columbus, Ohio), a neighborhood in Columbus, Ohio
 Franklin Park Conservatory, a conservatory in Columbus, Ohio
 Franklin Park, Florida
 Franklin Park, Illinois
 Franklin Park, Middlesex County, New Jersey
 Franklin Park, Trenton, New Jersey
 Franklin Park, New Jersey in Somerset County
 Franklin Park, Pennsylvania
 Franklin Park (race track), a defunct harness racing track in Saugus, Massachusetts
 Franklin Park, the original name of Franklin Square in Washington, D.C.